Ajo, Ajó, or AJO may refer to:

Places 
Ajo, Arizona, a census-designated place in Pima County, Arizona, US
 Ajo Peak, a mountain peak in southern Arizona
 Little Ajo Mountains, a mountain range in southern Arizona
 Ajo Unified School District
 Ajo High School
 Ajo Air Force Station, a closed US Air Force General Surveillance Radar station in southern Arizona
 Ajo Copper News, a weekly community newspaper serving western Pima County, Arizona
Ajo, Cantabria, the capital of Bareyo municipality in Cantabria, Spain
Mar de Ajó, a coastal city in Buenos Aires Province, Argentina
 Ajó, an alternate name for General Lavalle, a town in Buenos Aires Province, Argentina

People 
 Aki Ajo (born 1968), Finnish motorcycle racer
 Ajo Motorsport, a motorcycle racing team named after Aki Ajo
 Niklas Ajo (born 1994), Finnish motorcycle racer, eldest son of Aki Ajo

Other uses 
 Finlandia-Ajo, an annual Group One harness event
 Corona Municipal Airport, which has the location identifier AJO
 AcademicJobsOnline.org, a recruitment service for higher education, founded by the mathematics department at Duke University